British Airways operates a fleet of Airbus single aisle aircraft. It also operates a twin-aisle aircraft fleet of the Airbus A350-1000, Airbus A380, Boeing 777 and 787 wide-body aircraft, with most of it powered by Rolls-Royce Trent engines.

Current fleet

Passenger fleet 
, British Airways (excluding its subsidiary BA CityFlyer) operates the following aircraft:

Cargo fleet
IAG's cargo division, IAG Cargo, handles cargo operations using capacity on British Airways' passenger aircraft. IAG reached an agreement with Qatar Airways in 2014 to operate flights for IAG Cargo using Boeing 777F of Qatar Airways Cargo.

British Airways World Cargo was the airline's freight division prior to its merger with Iberia Cargo to form IAG Cargo. Aircraft types used by the division between 1974 and 1983 were Vickers 953C, Boeing 707-300C and Boeing 747-200F while the Boeing 747-400F was operated from the 1990s to 2001 through Atlas Air and 2002 to early 2012 by Global Supply Systems, of these only one of Atlas Air's aircraft wore BA livery, the others flew in Atlas and Global Supply's own colours. From 2012 until the termination of Global Supply System's contract in 2014, three Boeing 747-8F aircraft were flown for British Airways World Cargo.

Gallery

Order history

Except the Boeing 707 and early Boeing 747 variants from BOAC, British Airways inherited a mainly UK-built fleet of aircraft when it was formed in 1974. The airline introduced the Boeing 737 and Boeing 757 into the fleet in the 1980s, followed by the Boeing 747-400, Boeing 767 and Boeing 777 in the 1990s. BA was the largest operator of Boeing 747-400s, with 57 in its fleet. Prior to the introduction of the 787, when Boeing built an aircraft for British Airways, it was allocated the customer code 36, which appeared in their aircraft designation as a suffix, such as 777-236.

In 1991, British Airways placed its first order for 777-200 aircraft, ordering another four for fleet expansion in 2007 at a cost of around US$800 million. BA's first 777s were fitted with General Electric GE90 engines, but BA switched to Rolls-Royce Trent 800s for subsequent aircraft.

Later in 2007, BA announced their order of thirty-six new long-haul aircraft, including twelve Airbus A380s and twenty-four Boeing 787 Dreamliners. Rolls-Royce Trent engines were again selected for both orders with Trent 900s powering the A380s and Trent 1000s powering the 787s. The Boeing 787s will replace 14 of British Airways' Boeing 767 fleet, while the Airbus A380s will replace 20 of BA's Boeing 747-400s and will most likely be used to increase capacity on key routes from Heathrow Airport.

On 1 August 2008, BA announced orders for six Boeing 777-300ERs and options for four more as an interim measure to cover for delays over the deliveries of their 787-8/9s. Of the six that have been ordered, four will be leased and two will be fully acquired by British Airways.

On 22 April 2013, IAG confirmed that it had signed a memorandum of understanding to order 18 A350-1000 XWB aircraft for British Airways, with an option for a further 18. The aircraft would replace some of the airline's fleet of Boeing 747-400s. Options for 18 Boeing 787 aircraft, part of the original contract signed in 2007, have been converted into firm orders for delivery between 2017 and 2021.

On 26 June 2013, British Airways took delivery of its first Boeing 787 Dreamliner. The aircraft began operations to Toronto on 1 September 2013, and began service to Newark on 1 October 2013. BA's first A380 was delivered on 4 July 2013. It began regular services to Los Angeles on 24 September 2013, followed by Hong Kong on 22 October 2013.

At the 2019 Paris Air Show, British Airways owner, IAG, signed a letter of intent to purchase 200 Boeing 737 MAX aircraft, despite the type still being grounded worldwide.

In July 2019, the British carrier took delivery of its first Airbus A350-1000 XWB aircraft, fitted without First, but with more of the new Club World suites.

On 16 July 2020, British Airways announced it was immediately retiring the remaining Boeing 747-400 aircraft, the last having flown the previous month. British Airways had originally intended to phase out the last 747s by 2024, but brought the plans forward in part due to the downturn in air-travel following COVID-19 pandemic and to focus on replacing the 747 with the more fuel-efficient Airbus A350, Airbus A380, and Boeing 787.

Former fleet

See also
 Air France fleet
 Lufthansa fleet

Notes

References

British Airways
Lists of aircraft by operator